Maigret is a 1991 international television serial based on Georges Simenon's books. Detective Jules Maigret was played by Bruno Cremer. Only actor Jean Richard has portrayed Maigret more than Bruno Cremer.

Cast

Main 
Bruno Cremer as Detective Jules Maigret

Recurring 
Anne Bellec as Madame Maigret (seasons 1-5)
Jean-Claude Frissung and Jean O'Cottrell as Detective Janvier (seasons 1-11)
Philippe Pollet as Detective LaPointe (seasons 1-2)
Claude Faraldo as Palmari (seasons 2-3)
François-Régis Marchasson and Philippe Lejour as Judge Coméliau (seasons 2-3)
Jean-Pierre Gos as Detective Lucas (seasons 2-4)
Erick Desmarestz as Judge Benneau (seasons 2-5)
Michel Dussin, Bernard Papineau and Jean-Claude Calon as Doctor Paul (seasons 2-13)
Éric Prat as Detective Torrence (seasons 3-5)
Alexandre Brasseur as Inspector Paul Lachenal (seasons 9-11)
Fabien Béhar as Inspector Luciani (seasons 9-10)
Laurent Schilling and Olivier Darimont as Inspector Lambert (seasons 11-13)
Bruno Abraham-Kremer as Inspector Lorenzi (season 11)
Pierre Diot as Inspector Christiani (seasons 11-14)
Matthias Van Khache as Inspector Maury (season 12)
Jean-Paul Bonnaire as Inspector Battisti (seasons 12-14)

Guest
Karin Viard as Thérèse (season 1)
Myriam Boyer as Élyane Michonnet (season 2)
Françoise Bertin as Catherine (season 4)
François Perrot as Professor Gouin (season 4)
Béatrice Agenin as Arlette (season 4)
Marie-Christine Adam as Irène Salavin / Antoinette's assistant (season 4 & 14)
Albert Delpy as The captain (season 5)
Arielle Dombasle as Mylène Turner (season 7)
Ginette Garcin as Denise (season 7)
Laure Duthilleul as Evelyne Tremblet (season 9)
Jeanne Herry as Félicie (season 11)
Philippe Duquesne as Louis Paumelle (season 12)
Pascale Arbillot as Gisèle Marton (season 13)
Valérie Karsenti as Isabelle Fresco (season 14)

Episodes

Home media
In 2018, MHz Choice announced they had digitally remastered and re-subtitled the entire series. The show was available for HD streaming or purchase on SD DVD.

References

External links 

Television shows based on Belgian novels
1990s French television series
French crime television series
1991 French television series debuts
2005 French television series endings
Detective television series
French-language television shows
Television shows based on works by Georges Simenon
Czech crime television series